Uniformology is a branch of the auxiliary sciences of history which studies uniforms - especially military uniforms - through ages and civilizations.

See also 

 Full dress uniform
 Mess dress uniform
 Service dress uniform
 Combat uniform
 Armour
 Costumes
 Militaria

External links 

 

History of clothing
Military equipment
Uniforms